Jordan Thompson (born 20 April 1994) is an Australian professional tennis player, reaching a career-high ranking of World No. 43 on 15 July 2019. He made his Grand Slam debut at the 2014 Australian Open after winning the Australian Open wildcard play off in December 2013.

Personal life
Thompson was born in Sydney and, along with tennis, grew up as an avid fan of rugby league. He supports the Wests Tigers in the National Rugby League. Thompson names Lleyton Hewitt as his tennis idol. Thompson has a tattoo on his right bicep of the Australian coat of arms and Olympic rings which he attained after playing in the 2016 Olympic Games. Thompson's mantra is "hard work always pays off".

Junior career
The highlight of his junior career came at the 2012 US Open when he partnered with fellow Australian Nick Kyrgios to reach the doubles final. Thompson reached as high as No. 18 in the combined world rankings in October 2012, compiling a singles win–loss record of 82–38.

Professional career

2013: Pro beginnings
In 2013, Thompson made his debut on the professional circuit in qualifying at the 2013 Apia International Sydney where he lost to world number 81 Guillermo García-López. After receiving a wild card he won his first professional match in qualifying at the 2013 Australian Open against Nicolas Renavand 9–7 in the third set. He lost in the second round to 21st seed Ryan Sweeting.

Thompson then qualified and made the second round of the 2013 Burnie International losing to third seed John Millman. For the rest of the year he played mainly in Futures, where he made three finals. He won 2 titles, the Austria F5 ITF, Alice Springs F8 ITF and was runner up of Sydney F9 ITF. Thompson later made his Grand Slam debut at the 2014 Australian Open after winning the wildcard play off against Benjamin Mitchell on 15 December 2013.

He finished 2013 with an ATP ranking of No. 320.

2014: Grand Slam debut
Thompson started 2014 at the 2014 Brisbane International in qualifying where he lost in the first round against Tatsuma Ito. Thompson then competed at the 2014 AAMI Classic where he replaced Lleyton Hewitt in the draw. His first match was against world number 9 Richard Gasquet. He almost caused a huge upset when he served for the match at 5–3 in the third set. And he had two match points on Gasquet's serve in the next game. However, he lost the final set in a tiebreak by seven points to four.

He lost his second match to Mikhail Youzhny in straight sets. Thompson ended up finishing in seventh place after he upset world number 42 Juan Mónaco. This was Thompson's first victory over a top 50 player. Thompson lost in 5 sets to world number 21 Jerzy Janowicz in the first round of the 2014 Australian Open 6–1, 6–4, 4–6, 2–6, 1–6. On 21 January, Thompson was announced in the Australian squad of the 2014 Davis Cup as the back-up player.

In May, Thompson made the semifinal of the China International Challenger, which increased his ranking to a career-high of 277. In August, Thompson made his first Challenger final, but lost to Hyeon Chung in Bangkok. This further increased his ranking to 219. From September to November, Thompson competed in eight challenger tournaments throughout China, USA, Australia and Japan, with the second round being his best result. In December, Thompson won the Australian Open wildcard play off again, gaining him entry into the 2015 Australian Open.

2015: Top 200
Thompson earned a wild card into the 2015 Australian Open but lost in round 1 to João Sousa in straight sets. He then played in the Hong Kong Challenger and Burnie Challenger but lost in round at both. In February, Thompson made the semi-final of the Launceston Challenger before playing in Challenger events in Japan and China where his performance was a round 2. Thompson did win his first Challenger Doubles title with Ben Mitchell at Shimadzu Challenger. In March, Thompson returned to Australia where he won the F4 ITF title. In May, Thompson lost in round 1 of qualifying for the 2015 French Open before reaching the semi final of the Romanian F4. In June, Thompson turned to grass where he lost in the first round of Manchester Challenger and in qualifying for 2015 Topshelf Open and Ilkley Challenger. His broke into the world's top 200 on the 24 August, with a ranking of 193. In October, Thompson made the finals of the Ho Chi Minh City and Traralgon Challengers, further increasing his ranking. He ended the year with a ranking of 154.

2016: Top 100

Thompson began the year at New Caledonia, where he made the semi final. He was then given a wild card into the Sydney International, where he scored first his ATP World Tour win, when his opponent Martin Klizan retired when trailing 6–2, 4–0. In round two, Thompson played Bernard Tomic but lost 2–6, 2–6. At the 2016 Australian Open, Thompson was given a wild card, but lost to Thomaz Bellucci in round 1. In February, Thompson won his first ATP Challenger Tour title at the La Mache Challenger.

On 1 May, Thompson won the biggest title of his career at the $100,000 2016 Kunming Open, which increased his ranking into the top 100 for the first time in his career.

Thompson was awarded a wild card into the French Open, where he won his first main draw Grand Slam match against Laslo Đere. In the second round, Thompson played the 27th seed Ivo Karlovic, losing 7–6(7–2), 3–6, 6–7(3–7), 7–6(7–4), 10–12 in a four and a half hour match. At Wimbledon, Thompson lost to 14th seed Roberto Bautista Agut in straight sets. At the 2016 Summer Olympics, Thompson lost in round 1 to Kyle Edmund. At the US Open, Thompson lost to Steve Darcis in round 1, despite leading 2 sets to love and having 2 match points. Following the match, Thompson said "I just felt like I left myself down, let other people down. It's not good." In October, Thompson won his third and fourth Challenger title of the year in Vietnam and Traralgon. Thompson ended the year with a ranking of 79.

2017: Singles quarterfinal and doubles title
Thompson commenced the year at the 2017 Brisbane International, where he defeated Elias Ymer and David Ferrer to make his first ATP World Tour quarterfinal. He lost to Kei Nishikori in the quarterfinal. Thompson partnered Thanasi Kokkinakis in the doubles, where they reached the final, defeating Sam Querrey and Gilles Müller. In doing so, they became the first Australian duo to win the Brisbane International.

At the 2017 Apia International Sydney, Thompson defeated Nikoloz Basilashvili before losing to Philipp Kohlschreiber in round 2. At the 2017 Australian Open, Thompson recorded his first Australian Open win defeating João Sousa in round 1. He lost to Dominic Thiem in round 2. In February, Thompson made his debut at the Davis Cup, defeating Jiří Veselý. In March, Thompson made the main draw of the Mexican Open as a lucky loser. He defeated Feliciano López before losing to Yoshihito Nishioka in round 2. He lost in the first round of both Indian Wells and the Miami Masters, before returning to Australia when he defeated Jack Sock in the quarterfinals of the 2017 Davis Cup. In May, Thompson made the second round of Istanbul and Lyon, before losing to John Isner in the first round of 2017 French Open. In June, Thompson made the final of the Aegon Surbiton Trophy, losing to Yūichi Sugita.

Entering the Queen's Club Championships draw as a lucky loser, Thompson unexpectedly defeated the world No.1 Andy Murray 7–6(7–4), 6–2 in round one. The victory was Thompson's first against a top ten player, his first grass court win on the ATP World Tour and he became the first Australian player to beat Murray in an ATP-level singles match. Thompson lost in the second round to Sam Querrey. At Wimbledon, Thompson lost in round 1 to Albert Ramos Viñolas. In July, he reached the final of Levene Gouldin & Thompson Tennis Challenger. In August, Thompson came within two points of defeating eventual champion and world number 8 Alexander Zverev at the Citi Open before making the final of the Vancouver Challenger. At the US Open, Thompson defeated 13th seed Jack Sock before falling to Thomas Fabbiano in the second round. In October, Thompson qualified for the Shanghai Masters but lost to Diego Schwartzman in round 1. Thompson ended 2017 with a ranking of 94 in singles and 88 in doubles.

2018: Back to the Challenger circuit
Thompson commenced 2018 by losing in the first round of the Brisbane International, Sydney International and the Australian Open. In February, Thompson returned the Challenger Tour, where he made two consecutive finals in Chennai and Kyoto. Thompson lost to Casper Ruud in round 1 of the French Open and to Sam Querrey in round 1 of Wimbledon. In July, Thompson reached another Challenger final at Birmingham. Thompson lost to Cameron Norrie in round 1 of the US Open and to Dominic Thiem in the Australia v Austria 2018 Davis Cup World Group Play-offs. Following this in October, Thompson returned to the Challenger circuit reaching another three consecutive finals, winning the Traralgon Challenger and Canberra Tennis International. In 2018, he reached eight Challenger finals, winning three. Thompson finished 2018 with a singles ranking of 72.

2019: First ATP final, Top 50 ranking
Thompson commenced the 2019 season, losing to Alex De Minaur at both the Brisbane International and Sydney International. At the Australian Open, as a wildcard, Thompson defeated Feliciano López and lost to Andreas Seppi in the second round. In February, Thompson attained a then career-high singles ranking of 60 and reached the quarterfinals of the New York Open. The following month, Thompson defeated Grigor Dimitrov in a round three match at the 2019 Miami Open to reach the last 16 at a Masters 1000 tournament for the first time. 
He reached his first ATP final at the 2019 Libéma Open where he lost to Adrian Mannarino. As a result, he made his top 50 debut at World No. 46 on 17 June 2019. He reached a career-high ranking of World No. 43 on 15 July 2019.

2020: US Open fourth round
At the 2020 Australian Open, Thompson beat Alexander Bublik in straight sets, but lost to 12th seed Fabio Fognini in a match lasting over 4 hours 6–7(4–7), 1–6, 6–3, 6–4, 6–7(4–10).

Thompson achieved his best Grand Slam result to date by reaching the fourth round of the 2020 US Open, beating Stefano Travaglia, Egor Gerasimov and Mikhail Kukushkin before losing to 27th seed Borna Coric. Thompson finished 2020 with a singles ranking of World No. 51.

2021: Wimbledon third round
Thompson had a successful run at the 2021 Wimbledon Championships to the third round for the first time in his career where he defeated World No. 14 and 12th seed Casper Ruud in a five sets, his first win at this tournament and third top-20 win in the past three year. Thompson defeated Kei Nishikori in the second round before losing to Ilya Ivashka in the third round.

In July, Thompson reached the semifinals in Newport, where he lost to Jenson Brooksby. Thompson finished 2021 with a singles ranking of World No. 75.

2022: First Challenger title since 2018
Thompson didn't find his form until the grass court season got underway. He entered the 2022 Surbiton Trophy as the eighth seed where he only lost one set en route to the final. Thompson faced Denis Kudla in the title match where he won in straight sets, winning his first trophy since 2018. 

The following week, he entered last minute into the 2022 Nottingham Open where he was seeded third. Thompson won his first and second round matches in straight sets against Antoine Bellier and Jay Clarke respectively. His quarterfinal match against Mikhail Kukushkin went to three sets with Thompson prevailing. He then overcame compatriot Alexei Popyrin, who was the fifth seed, in straight sets in the semifinal. He played the top seed Dan Evans for the title, however he came up short.

2023: Tenth Challenger title, First top-5 win
At the 2023 BNP Paribas Open he defeated Gael Monfils and recorded his second top-10 win over world No. 3 and second seed Stefanos Tsitsipas to reach the third round. He then lost to Alejandro Tabilo in the third round.

Performance timelines

Singles
Current through the 2022 Davis Cup Finals.

Doubles

ATP career finals

Singles: 1 (1 runner-up)

Doubles: 2 (1 title, 1 runner-up)

Team competition finals

Davis Cup: 1 (1 runner-up)

ATP Challenger and ITF Futures finals

Singles: 31 (15–16)

Doubles: 15 (11–4)

Junior Grand Slam finals

Doubles: 1 (1 runner-up)

Wins over top 10 players

References

External links
 
 
 
 

1994 births
Living people
Australian male tennis players
Tennis players from Sydney
Tennis players at the 2016 Summer Olympics
Olympic tennis players of Australia
People educated at Oakhill College
21st-century Australian people